The Jakaya Kikwete Cardiac Institute is a public national specialized cardiovascular teaching and research hospital in Dar es Salaam, Tanzania. It caters to both paediatric and adult populations with patients referred from across the country. Services offered include diagnostics and imaging, as well as interventional cardiology procedures and cardiothoracic surgery.

Plans are underway to construct an extension of the hospital at the national hospital's campus in Mlonganzila outside the city center; this will be a larger facility than the current one.

References

Hospitals in Tanzania
Teaching hospitals
Hospitals established in 2015